"Shouldn't It Be Easier Than This" is a song written by John Jarrard and Rick Giles, and recorded by American country music artist Charley Pride.  It was released in October 1987 as the first single from his album I'm Gonna Love Her on the Radio.  The song peaked at No. 5 on the Billboard Hot Country Singles chart. It was Pride's 52nd and final Top 10 hit on Billboard country music charts.

Charts

Weekly charts

Year-end charts

References

1987 singles
1987 songs
Charley Pride songs
16th Avenue Records singles
Songs written by Rick Giles
Songs written by John Jarrard